Araguanã may refer to the following places in Brazil:

 Araguanã, Maranhão
 Araguanã, Tocantins